Stacko is the debut studio album by British rapper MoStack. It was released on 7 June 2019 via MizerMillion Entertainment and Virgin EMI. The album features guest appearances from British rappers J Hus, Dave, Stormzy, Fredo, and singer/songwriter Dolapo.

Track listing
Credits adapted from Tidal.

Charts

Certifications

References

2019 debut albums